Chatelain or Châtelain is a French surname. Notable people with the surname include:

 Christine Chatelain, a Canadian film and television actress
 Clara de Chatelain (1807-1876), an English writer and composer
 Danièle Chatelain, a professor of French and a writer
 Georges Chatelain (living), a French songwriter
 Hélène Châtelain, (1935-2020), a French actress
 Hubert Paul Chatelain (1917-?)
 Jean Baptiste Claude Chatelain (1710-?), a French engraver
 Jeremy Chatelain (disambiguation)

French-language surnames